General Francis Edward Gwyn (1748 – 1821) was a senior British Army officer.

Military career
Gwyn was commissioned as an ensign in the 17th Dragoons in February 1760. He served in the American War of Independence under Sir William Howe, Sir Henry Clinton and Lord Cornwallis. He was Governor of Sheerness from 1812 until his death in 1821 and also served as colonel of the 1st King's Dragoon Guards from 1820 until his death in 1821.

References

|-

British Army generals
1748 births
1821 deaths
British Army personnel of the American Revolutionary War